Odil may refer to:

People with the forename
Odil Ahmedov (born 1987), Uzbek football player
Odil Irgashev (born 1977), Tajikistani football player
Odil Yakubov (died 2009), Uzbek novelist